Gretchen Marie Hau is a Puerto Rican politician and lawyer. She is a senator, affiliated to the Popular Democratic Party of Puerto Rico. She is a "majority whip" in the Puerto Rican senate.

Education
Hau graduated from the University of Puerto Rico at Cayey with a bachelor's degree in Business Administration and a master's degree in Business Administration with concentration in Human Resources and Personnel Administration from the Interamerican University of Puerto Rico. She obtained Juris Doctor with honors in Law during 2010 from the Interamerican University of Puerto Rico School of Law.

See also
 List of Puerto Ricans

References

Year of birth missing (living people)
Interamerican University of Puerto Rico alumni
Members of the Senate of Puerto Rico
People from Cayey, Puerto Rico
People from San Germán, Puerto Rico
Popular Democratic Party (Puerto Rico) politicians
Puerto Rican politicians
Puerto Rican lawyers
Living people